Sam Lavagnino (born June 29, 2006) is an American voice actor and YouTuber whose roles include Catbug in Bravest Warriors and Young Grizz in We Bare Bears. He also voices the dog "Rolly" in the Disney Junior show Puppy Dog Pals and "Mr. Muffin" in the YouTube series asdfmovie.

Life and work
Lavagnino is the son of voice actress Hope Levy and screenwriter Tom Lavagnino. At 14 months old, he was on the cover of TIME magazine where he was dressed up as Albert Einstein. He was cast for Bravest Warriors as the role of Catbug, "a creature that’s half-cat, half-ladybug, who’s actually a big draw for the series simply for the random comments he makes and the sound of his voice." The series was broadcast in 2013, and he participated in the Cartoon Hangover panel for Comic-Con 2013 when he was seven years old, as well as an autograph session for Catbug-related comics at Comic-Con 2014. He provided a voice in the trailer for the 2014 film The Boxtrolls.  In 2015, he was cast as the voice of the younger version of Grizzly in We Bare Bears. He also voiced the character 'Mr. Muffin' in the Asdfmovie series created by TomSka. His first role as a leading character was as the puppy "Rolly" in the Disney Junior show Puppy Dog Pals. He also voices Pepper Corn on Summer Camp Island. He is also the voice of Blodger Blop from the Disney Junior show Miles From Tomorrowland.

Social media 
In 2017 he began making YouTube videos on his YouTube channel Samboozled where he does skits, reviews on games/movies, and more recently videos on his life like how it was like to voice Catbug in Bravest Warriors and Mr Muffin from asdfmovie. He also has a Twitter and a Tiktok where he posts frequently.

Filmography

Film, television, and video games

Other media
 Catbug e-book series - Catbug

References

External links

2006 births
Living people
American male voice actors
American male child actors
Male actors from Los Angeles